"We Ain't Goin Down" is the sixth single for the girl duo Shakaya and their second single from their second album Are You Ready. This is Shakaya's final single ever after the group disbanded in 2008.

Track listing

Charts

References

2005 singles
Shakaya songs
Songs written by Ray Hedges
Songs written by Tracy Ackerman
Song recordings produced by Ray Hedges
2005 songs
Sony BMG singles
Songs written by Nigel Butler